James Douglas Campbell (23 March 1886 – 16 January 1935) was an Australian rules footballer who played with Essendon in the Victorian Football League (VFL).

Notes

External links 
		

1886 births
1935 deaths
Australian rules footballers from Melbourne
Essendon Football Club players
Sturt Football Club players
Australian military personnel of World War I
People from Essendon, Victoria
Military personnel from Melbourne